There are ten stadiums in use by Texas League (TL) baseball teams. The oldest stadium is Nelson W. Wolff Municipal Stadium (1994) in San Antonio, Texas, home of the San Antonio Missions. The newest stadium is Riverfront Stadium (2020) in Wichita, Kansas, home of the Wichita Wind Surge. One stadium was built in the 1990s, six in the 2000s, two in the 2010s, and one in the 2020s. The highest seating capacity is 10,486 at Hammons Field in Springfield, Missouri, where the Springfield Cardinals play. The lowest capacity is 6,631 at Hodgetown in Amarillo, Texas, where the Amarillo Sod Poodles play. All stadiums use a grass surface.

Since its founding, there have been 67 stadiums located among 36 municipalities used by the league. The TL does not consider teams in existence from 1888 to 1890 as part of its franchise history. Therefore, the list does not include stadiums prior to it originating in 1902. Of the stadiums with known opening dates, the oldest to have hosted TL games was Gaston Park (1886), home of the Dallas Steers and Dallas Giants; Riverfront Stadium is also the newest of all stadiums to host TL games. The highest known seating capacity was 21,000 at Turnpike Stadium, the Dallas–Fort Worth Spurs home. The stadiums with the lowest known capacity were League Park (Longview, Texas) and Trojan Park Athletic Field, the respective homes of the Longview Cannibals and Tyler Sports, which each seated only 2,500.

Active stadiums
{|class="wikitable sortable plainrowheaders"
|-
!Name
!Team
!City
!State
!Opened
!data-sort-type="number"|Capacity
!class="unsortable"|Ref.
|-
!scope="row"|Arvest Ballpark
|Northwest Arkansas Naturals
|Springdale
|Arkansas
|2008
|align="right"|7,305
|
|-
!scope="row"|Dickey–Stephens Park
|Arkansas Travelers
|North Little Rock
|Arkansas
|2007
|align="right"|7,200
|
|-
!scope="row"|Hammons Field
|Springfield Cardinals
|Springfield
|Missouri
|2004
|align="right"|10,486
|
|-
!scope="row"|Hodgetown
|Amarillo Sod Poodles
|Amarillo
|Texas
|2019
|align="right"|6,631
|
|-
!scope="row"|Momentum Bank Ballpark
|Midland RockHounds
|Midland
|Texas
|2002
|align="right"|6,669
|
|-
!scope="row"|Nelson W. Wolff Municipal Stadium
|San Antonio Missions
|San Antonio
|Texas
|1994
|align="right"|9,200
|
|-
!scope="row"|ONEOK Field
|Tulsa Drillers
|Tulsa
|Oklahoma
|2010
|align="right"|7,833
|
|-
!scope="row"|Riders Field
|Frisco RoughRiders
|Frisco
|Texas
|2003
|align="right"|10,316
|
|-
!scope="row"|Riverfront Stadium
|Wichita Wind Surge
|Wichita
|Kansas
|2020
|align="right"|10,000
|
|-
!scope="row"|Whataburger Field
|Corpus Christi Hooks
|Corpus Christi
|Texas
|2005
|align="right"|7,050
|
|}

Map

Gallery

Former stadiums

Map

See also

List of Double-A baseball stadiums
List of Eastern League stadiums
List of Southern League stadiums
List of Texas League teams

Notes

References

External links

Digitalballparks.com's photographic history of Texas League ballparks since 1902

Texas League
Texas League stadiums
 
Texas League stadiums